The Trebouxiales are an order of green algae in the class Trebouxiophyceae.

References

 
Chlorophyta orders